Cantalapiedra is a village and municipality in the province of Salamanca, western Spain, part of the autonomous community of Castile and León.

The region forms part of the Field of Peñaranda.

Governed by the judicial system of Peñaranda, Cantalapiedra is a 'typical' town in Salamanca; in the middle of seamlessly endless plains of fertile wheat, and located between such historic states as the Old Kingdom of León and the Old Kingdom of Castile.

The first organization in Cantalapiedra was the church of Santa Maria of the Castle. The town is surrounded by plains to the north, northeast, northwest and south, grown there to 'frame' the town. Its historic past is reflected in local landmarks, like the street of Weavers, encased within a wall, which goes up to the old slaughter house and leads to the street of the hospital. The rest of the old enclosure symbolizes the tower of the Dean. Now one can stroll down the main streets, immersed in the cultural and economic growth which has occurred in the 20th and 21st centuries. The town is served by a railway line. Cantalapiedra is the antipode of Whitby, New Zealand.

See also
List of municipalities in Salamanca

References

Municipalities in the Province of Salamanca